The All-Ireland Senior B Hurling Championship of 1975 was the second staging of Ireland's secondary hurling knock-out competition.  Westmeath won the championship, beating London 3-23 to 2-7 in a replayed final at Croke Park, Dublin.

The championship

Participating teams

Format

Quarter-finals: (4 matches) These are four matches between the eight native participating teams.  Four teams are eliminated at this stage while the four winning teams qualify for the semi-final stages.

Semi-finals: (2 matches) The four winners from the quarter-finals contest these games.  Two teams are eliminated at this stage while the two winners advance to the 'home' final.

Home final: (1 match) The winners of the two semi-finals contest this game.  One team is eliminated at this stage while the winners advance to the 'proper' All-Ireland final.

Final: (1 match) The winners of the All-Ireland 'home' final join London to contest this game.  One team is eliminated at this stage while the winners are allowed to participate in the All-Ireland SHC quarter-final.

Fixtures

All-Ireland Senior B Hurling Championship

Championship statistics

Scoring

Widest winning margin: 19 points
Westmeath 3-23 : 2-7 London (All-Ireland final replay)
Most goals in a match: 7
Westmeath 4-16 : 3-19 London (All-Ireland final)
Most points in a match: 39
Westmeath 2-22 : 2-17 Antrim (All-Ireland semi-final)
Most goals by one team in a match: 4
Westmeath 4-16 : 3-19 London (All-Ireland final)
Most goals scored by a losing team: 3
Meath 3-6 : 2-14 Kerry (All-Ireland semi-final)
Most points scored by a losing team: 17
Antrim 2-17 :  2-22 Westmeath (All-Ireland semi-final)

Overall
Most goals scored - Westmeath (14)
Fewest goals scored - Carlow (0)
Most goals conceded - Westmeath (9)
Most points scored - Westmeath (83)
Fewest points scored - Roscommon (2)
Most points conceded - Westmeath (61)

Top scorers

Season

Single game

References

 Donegan, Des, The Complete Handbook of Gaelic Games (DBA Publications Limited, 2005).

1975
B